QE3 may refer to:
 MS Queen Elizabeth, third Cunard passenger ship of the name
 Round 3 of quantitative easing
 (5346) 1981 QE3, an asteroid
 Qe3, the algebraic chess notation for a move of the queen to square e3
 QE3, the boat Don Allum used for his atlantic crossing

See also
 QE (disambiguation)
 QE1 (disambiguation)
 QE2 (disambiguation)